Pariah's Pariah is the tenth album by saxophonist Gary Thomas recorded in 1997 and released on the Winter & Winter label.

Reception

AllMusic awarded the album 4 stars stating it "maintains a consistently high level of musical quality from start to finish". AllAboutJazz called it "a powerful recording that instills hope and assurance for the future of Modern Jazz. Stefan Winter of Winter & Winter continues his superb track record of producing quality product that is essential listening for the serious Jazz collector/audiophile. Pariah’s Pariah hits the high mark and won’t disappoint. Highly Recommended".

Track listing
All compositions by Gary Thomas
 "Who's in Control?" ("Only Hearsay") - 8:38
 "Only Hearsay" ("Pariah's Pariah") - 13:08
 "Pariah's Pariah" (not) - 9:14
 "Zero Tolerance" ("Who's In Control?") - 10:38
 "Vanishing Time" - 9:51
 "For Those Who Still Hear the..." - 7:03
 "Is Everything Relative?" - 7:27

Personnel
Gary Thomas - tenor saxophone, flute
Greg Osby - alto saxophone
Michael Formanek - bass 
John Arnold - drums

Notes

The track names are wrong, at least for the first four songs. For instance, "Who's in Control" is "Only Hearsay," "Only Hearsay" is "Pariah's Pariah," and "Zero Tolerance" is "Who's In Control."

References 

1998 albums
Gary Thomas (musician) albums
Winter & Winter Records albums